Robin Daniels may refer to:

Robin Daniels (businessman)
Robin Daniels of A Sunny Day in Glasgow